A list of horror films released in 1988.

References

Sources

 

 
 
 
 

 
 

 
 

  

Lists of horror films by year
Horror